Mothers’ Instinct is an upcoming psychological thriller film directed by Benoît Delhomme, a remake of Olivier Masset-Depasse's 2018 French-language film of the same name, which itself was a loose adaptation of the 2012 novel Behind the Hatred (Derrière la haine) by Barbara Abel.

Premise
The friendship of two 1960s housewives rapidly deteriorates after a tragedy.

Cast
Jessica Chastain as Alice
Anne Hathaway as Celine
Josh Charles
Anders Danielsen Lie
Caroline Lagerfelt

Production
It was announced in October 2020 that Jessica Chastain and Anne Hathaway were cast to star in the film, with Olivier Masset-Depasse directing. Chastain's production company Freckle Films is set to executive produce. In June 2022, it was reported that Benoît Delhomme would direct after Masset-Depasse bowed out due to a family commitment. Josh Charles and Anders Danielsen Lie also joined the cast.

Filming began on May 25, 2022 in Union County, New Jersey.

Release
Neon acquired the U.S. distribution rights in May 2022.

References

External links
Mothers' Instinct at the Internet Movie Database

Upcoming films
American psychological thriller films
Films shot in New Jersey
Films set in the 1960s
American remakes of Belgian films